Armas Ugartechea is a Basque Spanish manufacturer of guns and rifles located in Eibar, is a privately held Spanish firearms manufacturing company. Its firearms are used worldwide for a variety of sporting and hunting purposes. It produces several models of double-barreled shotgun. It is devoted to the craft manufacturing of fine hunting shotguns and is the heir of a long craftsman tradition that has cleverly incorporated new technologies in the production of its guns, and, at the same time, keeping its traditional know how. It was the first Spanish company to start making under and over barrel guns. I. Ugartechea is well known for the quality of its work both at home and abroad. Is one of the few gunmakers to produce its own barrels, flawless at best. A present, Armas Ugartechea sells its guns worldwide. Among its customers are heads of state and monarchs from several countries, as well as top hunters and crack shots. The Ugartechea Family is still in charge of the company which is a basic principle, as they are the ones who know better how to optimize the manufacture of these firearms, which combine with craftsman work the best technology.

History 
Armas Ugartechea was founded by D. Ignacio Ugartechea in 1922. There have been three Ignacio Ugartechea in the history of the company: Founder, son and grandson. The first Ignacio named his company Casa Ugartechea and it settled in La Bidebarrieta, the first of the several locations that the company occupied as it grew and diversified. After a few years, he moved to Eibar in San Agustín Kalea, and finally to Txonta Kalea, No. 26, where it is currently located. In addition to shotguns, Armas Ugartechea once made rifles and pistols. However, the firm is most famous for its side-by-side double-barreled shotgun, and at some point stopped manufacturing the over/under double-barreled shotgun configuration. The change in the product was due in part to several different factors. After World War II, the international demand for sporting shotguns increased while the demand for pistols and rifles decreased. More importantly, Ignacio Ugartechea in the early days made the Model 1031 Número 6 side by side shotgun to ex-president of Mexico General Álvaro Obregón, also double rifle an 8x65R Brenneke, for the Caudillo himself in 1943, Generalissimo Francisco Franco and then Armas Ugartechea was passed on to the first Ignacio's son. 

One of the most famous guns was the first boxlock action, which was a hammerless action of a type commonly used in double barrelled shotguns. The boxlock action uses concealed, self-cocking hammers in a break-open action. It was strongly opposed by most sportsmen and manufacturers at first but became the dominant form of double barrelled shotgun action.

In 1928 they granted the trademark EL CASCO and requested registration of an industrial drawing to make a specialized shotgun catalog.
In the census carried out in 1929, Ignacio Ugartechea appears as a manufacturer of shotguns and pistols for the "San Humberto" brand to distinguish all kinds of short and long arms, obtaining in 1933 patent no. 129218 defined as "overlapping barrels for hunting shotguns joined and aligned by means of flat surfaces” and number 131047 for “a hidden key system for hunting shotguns, equipped with a safety interposition of another piece in advance of the firing pin that prevents the weapon from being fired accidentally”. Other Models like the “Sport” model, the “Chirri” as a light shotgun and the “Iñaki” as a heavy pigeon-shooting weapon.
Ignacio Ugartechea commercialized semi-automatic pistols manufactured by Gabilondo y Cia. and by Tomas de Urizar y Cia using trademarks owned by him as well as revolvers manufactured by Olave Solozabal y Cia. to which he awarded the brand “El Casco”.

In 1933 Casa Ugartechea became the first Spanish company to be licensed to produce express rifles in Spain as large as .400, .450, .500, .577 and .600 Nitro Express. The company made the .45 caliber semiautomatic pistol in 1926 with a patent in his name No. 97164 for a type of 2-shot central percussion pistol.

The second Ignacio Ugartechea was trained in the tradition of gun making at the prestigious Escuela de Armeria in Eibar. At one point, he was known as one of the most prominent hunter in Spain and Europe, developing a relationship and participating in social hunts with the likes of the king of Spain, Juan Carlos I.

Armas Ugartechea builds guns based on designs and patents originating from London and Birmingham firms such as Holland & Holland and Westley Richards. When shotgun-making was in its heyday in the late nineteenth century, patents were only granted for fourteen years. After that period, advancements like the Anson & Deeley boxlock action were reproduced all over the world. When a patent that seemed efficient and easy to reproduce became available, it was not uncommon for Basque shotgun makers to reproduce it with local components, and market it as a less-expensive alternative to the English offerings like the 600 Deluxe Series marketed by Parker-Hale a British firearms manufacturer.

Further Changes 
Armas Ugartechea originally made matched pairs of sidelocks guns for export to England. In a sidelock action, the mechanism that makes the gun function can be removed and reinserted fairly easily. At that time, the shooting of driven pheasant and partridge at large English country houses; and pigeons in Spanish pigeon rings; was very popular. These shooting sports required shotguns that could be repaired in the field. Ugartechea was the first to manufacture superimposed shotguns. He makes his own shotgun overlaid in caliber 410, a caprice that many would have wanted for themselves. Many people are still interested in this shotgun This made the sidelock very desirable (and expensive), and selling the sidelock action became a clear priority. Famous gun owners have included Ernest Hemingway with the model Dixon-Falcon  among other notable clients.

Eventually, the sidelock fad passed and the simpler and less expensive boxlock action gained popularity. Driven shooting and pigeon rings became less and less accessible, and sidelocks came to be considered more of a luxury. This was especially true for the rapidly growing American market after World War II. In the United States, consumers were generally looking for a gun with the features of the traditional English shotgun, but not the corresponding steep price tag. Up until this point, Armas Ugartechea traditionally spent less time on its boxlock guns, producing mainly lower-end offerings. However, perceiving a change in the market, the company switched its focus to the boxlock, and now exports them to the United States.

See also
James Purdey & Sons
John Rigby & Company
Westley Richards

References

External links
 U.S. Importer since 1987 with further reading and availability
 U.S. Importer site with further reading
 Ugartechea - corporate site
 Museo Industria Armera Ugartechea - site
 
 Privately held companies of Spain
 Firearm manufacturers of Spain
 Weapons of Spain
Shotguns
 
Double-barreled shotguns
Gunsmiths
Firearm designers